The 2002 Women's British Open was held 8–11 August at the Ailsa Course at Turnberry Golf Club in South Ayrshire, Scotland. It was the 26th edition of the Women's British Open, and the second as a major championship on the LPGA Tour. ESPN, ABC Sports and BBC Sport televised the event in the United States and United Kingdom.

Karrie Webb won the sixth of her seven major titles, two strokes ahead of runners-up Michelle Ellis and Paula Martí. Three strokes back after 54 holes, Webb shot a final round 66 (−6) to capture her fifth different major for a career "Super Slam."  It was her third victory at the Women's British Open, with previous titles in 1995 and 1997.

Defending champion Se-Ri Pak finished six strokes back, in a tie for eleventh place.

Course
 Ailsa Course

Source:
 1 These par-4 holes are played as par-5 during this tournament.

Round summaries

First round
Thursday, 8 August 2002

Second round
Friday, 9 August 2002

Amateurs: Brewerton (+2), Weeks (+11)

Third round
Saturday, 10 August 2002

Final round
Sunday, 11 August 2002

Source:

Scorecard
Final round

Cumulative tournament scores, relative to par
Source:

References

External links
Ladies European Tour: 2002 Weetabix Women's British Open results
LPGA: 2002 Women's British Open results

Women's British Open
Golf tournaments in Scotland
British Open
Women's British Open
August 2002 sports events in the United Kingdom